Video nasty is a colloquial term popularised by the National Viewers' and Listeners' Association (NVALA) in the United Kingdom to refer to a number of films, typically low-budget horror or exploitation films, distributed on video cassette that were criticised for their violent content by the press, social commentators and various religious organisations in the early 1980s. These video releases were not brought before the British Board of Film Classification (BBFC) due to a loophole in film classification laws that allowed videos to bypass the review process. The resulting uncensored video releases led to public debate concerning the availability of these films to children due to the unregulated nature of the market.

Following a campaign led by Mary Whitehouse and the NVALA, prosecutions were commenced against individuals engaged in trades exploiting allegedly obscene videos. To assist local authorities in identifying obscene films, the Director of Public Prosecutions released a list of 72 films the office believed to violate the Obscene Publications Act 1959. This list included films that had either been previously acquitted of obscenity or already obtained BBFC certification. In addition, a second list was released that contained an additional 82 titles which were not believed to lead to obscenity convictions but could nonetheless be confiscated under the Act's forfeiture laws. The resultant confusion regarding the definition of obscene material led to Parliament passing the Video Recordings Act 1984, which required certification of video releases by the BBFC.

The implementation of the Video Recording Act imposed a stricter code of censorship on videos than was required for cinema release. Several major studio productions were banned on video, as they fell within the scope of legislation designed to control the distribution of video nasties. In recent years, the stricter requirements have been relaxed, as numerous films once considered video nasties have obtained certification uncut or with minimal edits. Due to a legislative mistake discovered in August 2009, the Video Recordings Act 1984 was repealed and re-enacted without change by the Video Recordings Act 2010.

Obscenity and video 
At the time of the introduction of domestic video recorders in the United Kingdom during the 1970s, there was no legislation specifically designed to regulate video content, apart from the Obscene Publications Act 1959 which had been amended in 1977 to cover erotic films. Major film distributors were initially reluctant to embrace the new medium of video for fear of piracy and the video market became flooded with low-budget horror films. Whilst some of these films had been passed by the British Board of Film Censors (BBFC) for cinema release, others had been refused certification which effectively banned them. The Obscene Publications Act defined obscenity as that which may "tend to deprave and corrupt persons who are likely, having regard to all relevant circumstances, to read, see or hear the matter contained or embodied in it". This definition is of course open to wide interpretation.

If the Director of Public Prosecutions (DPP) felt that a certain video might be in breach of the Act, then a prosecution could be brought against the film's producers, distributors and retailers. Prosecutions had to be fought on a case-by-case basis and a backlog of prosecutions built up. However, under the terms of the Act the police were empowered to seize videos from retailers if they were of the opinion that the material was in breach of the Act. In the early 1980s, in certain police constabularies, notably Greater Manchester Police which was at that time run by devout Christian Chief Constable James Anderton, police raids on video hire shops increased. The choice of titles seized appeared to be completely arbitrary, one raid famously netting a copy of the Dolly Parton musical The Best Little Whorehouse in Texas (1982) under the mistaken belief it was pornographic.

The Video Retailers Association were alarmed by the apparently random seizures and asked the DPP to provide a guideline for the industry so that stockists could be made aware of the titles which were liable to be confiscated. The DPP recognised that the current system, where the interpretation of obscenity was down to individual Chief Constables, was inconsistent and decided to publish a list that contained names of films that had already resulted in a successful prosecution or where the DPP had already filed charges against the video's distributors. This list became known as the DPP list of "video nasties".

The lack of regulation of the domestic video market was in sharp contrast to the regulation of material intended for public screenings. The BBFC had been established in 1912, essentially as an unintended consequence of the Cinematograph Act 1909, and it was their responsibility to pass films intended for the cinema for certification within the United Kingdom (though local councils were the final arbiters). As part of this process the board could recommend, or demand in the more extreme cases, that certain cuts be made to the film in order for it to gain a particular certification. Such permission was not always granted, and in the case of the release of The Exorcist in 1973, a number of enterprising managers of cinemas where permission had been granted set about providing buses to transport cinema-goers from other localities where the film could not be seen.

Public concern 
Public awareness of the availability of these videos began in early 1982, when Vipco (Video Instant Picture Company), the UK distributors of The Driller Killer, a 1979 splatter film, took out full-page advertisements in a number of specialist video magazines, depicting the video's explicit cover; an action which resulted in a large number of complaints to the Advertising Standards Agency. A few months later Go Video, the distributors of the already-controversial 1980 Italian film Cannibal Holocaust, in an effort to boost publicity and generate sales that ultimately backfired, wrote anonymously to Mary Whitehouse of the National Viewers' and Listeners' Association complaining about their own film. Whitehouse sparked off a public campaign and coined the term "video nasty". Amid the growing concern, The Sunday Times brought the issue to a wider audience in May 1982 with an article entitled "How High Street Horror is Invading the Home". Soon the Daily Mail began their own campaign against the distribution of these films. The exposure of "nasties" to children began to be blamed for the increase in violent crime amongst youths. The growing media frenzy only served to increase the demand for such material among adolescents. At the suggestion of the National Viewers' and Listeners' Association, the Conservative MP Graham Bright introduced a Private Member's Bill to the House of Commons in 1983. This was passed as the Video Recordings Act 1984 which came into effect on 1 September 1985.

Effects of the Video Recordings Act 1984 
Under the 1984 Act, the British Board of Film Censors was renamed the British Board of Film Classification and became responsible for the certification of both cinema and video releases. All video releases after 1 September 1985 had to comply with the Act and be submitted for classification by the BBFC. Films released on video before that date had to be re-submitted for classification within the following three years. The increased possibility of videos falling into the hands of children required that film classification for video be a separate process from cinema classification. Films that had passed uncut for cinema release were often cut for video.

The supply of unclassified videos became a criminal offence, as did supplying 15 and 18 certificate videos to under-aged people. As well as the low-budget horror films the Act was originally intended to curb, a number of high-profile films which had passed cinema certification fell foul of the Act. In particular, The Exorcist, which was made available by Warner Home Video in December 1981, was not submitted for video certification by the BBFC and was withdrawn from shelves in 1986. Similarly Straw Dogs was denied video certification and removed from video stores. Popular culture backlash against the Video Recordings Act included the May 1984 release of "Nasty" by the punk-goth outfit The Damned, who celebrated the condemned genre with the lyrics "I fell in love with a video nasty".

Relaxation of censorship 
With the passing of the Video Recordings Act, the films on the list could be prosecuted for both obscenity and not being classified. As well as not passing any film liable to be found obscene, the BBFC imposed additional bans and cuts on films such as The Texas Chain Saw Massacre. Claims, since proven at best to be speculative, at worst outright media fabrication, relating to the Hungerford massacre and the murder of James Bulger (where the 1991 film Child's Play 3 was erroneously held up as influencing the perpetrators, possibly prompting the 1992 film Mikey to be prohibited in the UK), provided an additional impetus to restrict films and as late as December 1997, the board claimed it "has never relaxed its guidelines on video violence, which remain the strictest in the world". However, the board did loosen its standards, especially at the 18 level, in response to public consultation in 2000. The departure of James Ferman from the BBFC may also have allowed some long-proscribed films to be re-appraised around this time. The Exorcist was granted an uncut 18 video certificate on 25 February 1999, followed by The Texas Chain Saw Massacre in August, and several official "nasties" were passed in the early 2000s either uncut or with cuts restricted to sexual violence or actual animals being harmed. A list of these is given below. Among modern films, many, such as the Hostel and Saw series, contain brutal, graphic violence but have passed through uncut.

In 2008, there was another brief media frenzy over such films that had years earlier been approved for release by the BBFC, in particular SS Experiment Camp. This coincided with an attempt by MPs Julian Brazier and Keith Vaz to pass a law allowing MPs greater powers to tighten BBFC guidelines or force an appeal of a release. The bill failed to pass.

The UK Government passed a law criminalising possession of "extreme pornography". Whilst BBFC-rated films are exempt from the legislation, screenshots from these same BBFC-rated movies are not, and would also apply to unrated films. Hostel: Part II was cited in the House of Commons as an example of a film where screenshots could become illegal to possess.

DPP list 
The DPP list of "video nasties" was first made public in June 1983. The list was modified monthly as prosecutions failed or were dropped. In total, 72 separate films appeared on the list at one time or another. 39 films were successfully prosecuted under the Obscene Publications Act but some of these films have been subsequently cut and then approved for release by the BBFC. The remaining 33 were either not prosecuted or had unsuccessful prosecutions. 10 films remain banned in the UK because they have not yet been resubmitted for classification by any distributors or have been rejected for classification.

A number of films spent a short time on this list because their prosecutions failed shortly after publication or because it was decided that prosecution was not worth pursuing. Ultimately, the list became obsolete when the Video Recordings Act came into force, and since 2001, several of the films have been released uncut. In the majority of cases below where cuts were made, they were scenes of real-life animal cruelty and/or excessive violence to women, both of which are still regarded with some degree of severity by the BBFC. A large number of these movies caused additional controversy with the cover art of the original big box releases seen in the video shops of the early 1980s. Unless noted otherwise, all films that have been released have been rated 18.

The DPP list is divided into two sections: Section 1 and Section 2. Any title seized under Section 1 would make the dealer or distributor liable to prosecution for disseminating obscene materials. Dealers could be fined or jailed and the film itself would be declared obscene if the prosecution was successful, meaning it could not be distributed or sold in the UK until the obscenity was quashed. 39 of the Section 1 films were successfully prosecuted and remained banned. 33 of the Section 1 films had unsuccessful prosecutions and were subsequently dropped from the list and placed onto Section 2.

Section 2 titles were liable to be confiscated under a "less obscene" charge, which allowed the police to seize a film they considered obscene and as long as the dealer cooperated, they legally admit that the articles are obscene and therefore escape any personal prosecution. The 33 films that couldn't be prosecuted under Section 1 automatically became Section 2 titles and were still seized by the police. The main difference between Section 1 and 2 is that video dealers or distributors could be personally prosecuted in court for holding the film under Section 1 but not under Section 2, where the obscenity is admitted through forfeiting the material.

Section 1: Prosecuted films 

 Absurd (original title: Rosso Sangue, also known as Monster Hunter, Anthropophagus 2, and Horrible) – Originally passed with cuts for cinema. Released uncut in 2017. The film is classified at 18.
 Anthropophagous: The Beast (original title: Antropophagus, also known as Anthropophagous, Antropofago, The Grim Reaper, Man Beast, Man-Eater, and The Savage Island) – Released with approximately 8 minutes of pre-edits as The Grim Reaper in 2002. Complete version passed uncut in June 2015.
 Axe (also known as Lisa, Lisa and California Axe Massacre) – Originally passed with cuts for cinema. Released with 19 seconds cut in 1999. Released uncut in 2005 with an 18 certificate.
 A Bay of Blood (original title: Reazione a Catena, also known as Twitch of the Death Nerve, Blood Bath and simply Bay of Blood) – Originally refused a cinema certificate in 1972. Released with 43 seconds cut in 1994. Re-released uncut in 2010.
 The Beast in Heat (original title: La Bestia in Calore, also known as SS Hell Camp) – No UK re-release.
 Blood Feast – Released with 23 seconds cut in 2001. Re-released uncut in 2005.
 Blood Rites (also known as The Ghastly Ones) – No UK re-release.
 Bloody Moon (original title: Die Säge des Todes) – Originally passed with cuts for cinema. Released with 1 minute 20 seconds cut in 1993. Released uncut November 2008.
 The Burning – Originally passed with cuts for cinema. Released with 19 seconds cut in 1992. Re-released uncut in 2001.
 Cannibal Apocalypse (original title: Apocalypse Domani, also known as Invasion of the Flesh Hunters) – Released with 2 seconds of animal cruelty cut in 2005.
 Cannibal Ferox (also known as Make Them Die Slowly) – Released with approximately 6 minutes of pre-cuts plus an additional 6 sec cut to a scene of animal cruelty in 2000. Re-released with 1 minute 55 seconds of animal cruelty cuts in 2018.
 Cannibal Holocaust – Released in 2001 with 5 minutes 44 seconds cut to remove most animal cruelty and rape scenes. Re-released with 15 seconds cut to one animal cruelty scene in 2011.
 The Cannibal Man (original title: La Semana del Asesino) – Released with 3 seconds cut in 1993.
 Devil Hunter (original title: El Canibal) – Released uncut in November 2008.
 Don't Go in the Woods – Released uncut in 2007 with a 15 rating.
 The Driller Killer – Released with 54 seconds of pre-cuts in 1999. Re-released uncut in 2002. Now considered to be in public domain.
 Evilspeak – Released with 3 minutes 34 seconds cut in 1987. Re-released uncut in 2004.
 Exposé (also known as House on Straw Hill) – Originally passed with cuts for cinema. Released with 51 seconds cut in 1997.
 Faces of Death – Released with 2 minutes 19 seconds cut to animal cruelty in 2003.
 Fight for Your Life – Originally refused a cinema certificate in 1981. No UK re-release.
 Flesh for Frankenstein (also known as Andy Warhol's Frankenstein) – Originally passed with cuts for cinema. Released with 56 seconds cut in 1996. Released uncut in 2006.
 Forest of Fear (also known as Toxic Zombies and Bloodeaters) – No UK re-release.
 Gestapo's Last Orgy (original title: L'ultima orgia del III Reich, also known as Last Orgy of the Third Reich and Caligula Reincarnated As Hitler) –  Refused a video certificate in 2021.
 The House by the Cemetery (original title: Quella villa accanto al cimitero) – Originally passed with cuts for cinema. Released with over 4 minutes cut in 1988. Re-released with 33 seconds cut in 2001. Released uncut in 2009.
 The House on the Edge of the Park (original title: La casa sperduta nel parco) – Originally refused a cinema certificate in 1981. Released with 11 minutes 43 seconds cut in 2002, and re-released with 42 seconds cut in 2011. Passed fully uncut in May 2022.
 I Spit on Your Grave (also known as Day of the Woman) – Released with 7 minutes 2 seconds cut in 2001. Re-released in a longer re-edited format in 2003 which reframed the rape scenes but was cut by 43 seconds to the second rape scene by the BBFC. The original print was released again with 3 minutes cut in 2010, and the film again received 1 minute 41 seconds of cuts for the 2020 Blu-ray release.
 Island of Death (original title: Ta Pedhia tou dhiavolou, also known as Devils in Mykonos and A Craving For Lust) – Originally passed with cuts for cinema. Refused a video certificate in 1987 under the title Psychic Killer II. Re-released with 4 minutes 9 seconds cut in 2002. Released uncut September 2010.
 The Last House on the Left – Originally refused a cinema certificate in 1974 and again in 2000. Also refused a video certificate in 2001. Passed with 31 seconds cut in 2002. Released uncut on 17 March 2008.
 Love Camp 7 – Refused a video certificate in 2002. Refused a certificate for streaming in 2020.
 Madhouse (also known as There Was a Little Girl) – Released uncut in 2004.
 Mardi Gras Massacre – Passed fully uncut in March 2022.
 Nightmares in a Damaged Brain (also known as Nightmare) – Originally passed with cuts for cinema. Released with approximately 3 minutes of pre-edits in 2005. Re-released uncut in November 2015.
 Night of the Bloody Apes (original title: La Horripilante bestia humana) – Originally passed with cuts for cinema. Released with approximately 3 minutes of pre-cuts in 1999. Re-released uncut in 2002.
 Night of the Demon – Released with 1 minute 41 seconds cut in 1994. Released uncut in 2022. 
 Snuff – Passed uncut in 2003 but no UK release to date.
 SS Experiment Camp (original title: Lager SSadis Kastrat Kommandantur, also known as SS Experiment Love Camp) – Released uncut in 2005.
 Tenebrae (original title: Tenebre, also known as Unsane) – Originally passed with cuts for cinema. Released with 5 seconds cut in 1999. Re-released uncut in 2003.
 The Werewolf and the Yeti (original title: La Maldicion de la Bestia, also known as Night of the Howling Beast) – No UK re-release.
 Zombie Flesh Eaters (also known as Zombie and Zombi 2) – Originally passed with cuts for cinema. Released with 1 minute 46 seconds cut in 1992. Re-released with 23 seconds cut in 1999. Released uncut in 2005.

Section 2: Non Prosecuted films 

 The Beyond (original title: E Tu Vivrai Nel Terrore ‒ L'Aldilà, also known as Seven Doors of Death) — Originally passed with cuts for cinema. Released with approximately 2 minutes cut in 1987. Re-released uncut in 2001.
 The Bogey Man (also known as The Boogeyman) — Originally passed uncut for cinema. Released with 44 seconds cut in 1992. Re-released uncut in 2000.
 Cannibal Terror (original title: Terreur Cannibale) — Released uncut in 2003.
 Contamination — Released uncut in 2004 with a 15 rating.
 Dead & Buried — Originally passed uncut for cinema. Released with 30 seconds cut in 1990. Re-released uncut in 1999.
 Death Trap (also known as Eaten Alive and Starlight Slaughter) — Originally passed with cuts for cinema. Released with 25 seconds cut in 1992. Re-released uncut in 2000.
 Deep River Savages (original title: Il paese del sesso selvaggio, also known as Man From Deep River) — Originally refused a cinema certificate in 1975. Eventually released with 3 minutes 45 seconds of animal cruelty cuts in 2003, and re-released with 3 minutes of similar cuts in 2016.
 Delirium (also known as Psycho Puppet) — Released with 16 seconds cut in 1987. Released uncut in February 2022.
 Don't Go in the House — Originally passed with cuts for cinema. Released with 3 minutes 7 seconds cut in 1987. Re-released uncut in December 2011.
 Don't Go Near the Park — Released uncut in 2006.
 Don't Look in the Basement (also known as The Forgotten) — Originally passed with cuts for cinema. Released uncut in 2005 with a 15 rating.
 The Evil Dead — Originally passed with cuts for cinema. Released with approximately 2 minutes cut in 1990. Re-released uncut in 2001.
 Frozen Scream — No UK re-release.
 The Funhouse — Originally passed uncut for cinema. Released uncut in 1987. Re-classified 15 in 2007.
 Human Experiments  — Originally passed uncut for cinema. No UK re-release.
 I Miss You, Hugs and Kisses (also known as Drop Dead Dearest) — Released with 1 minute 6 seconds cut in 1986.
 Inferno — Originally passed with cuts for cinema. Released with 20 seconds cut in 1993. Re-released uncut in September 2010.
 Killer Nun (original title: Suor Omicidi) — Released with 13 seconds cut in 1993. Re-released uncut in 2006.
 Late Night Trains (original title: L'ultimo treno della notte, also known as Night Train Murders) — Originally refused a cinema certificate in 1976. Released uncut in 2008.
 The Living Dead at the Manchester Morgue (original title: Non si deve profanare il sonno dei morti, also known as Let Sleeping Corpses Lie and Don't Open the Window) — Originally passed with cuts for cinema. Released with 1 minute 53 seconds cut in 1985. Re-released uncut in 2002.
 Nightmare Maker (also known as Night Warning and Butcher, Baker, Nightmare Maker) — Refused a video certificate in 1987 under the title The Evil Protege. No UK re-release.
 Possession — Originally passed uncut for cinema. Released uncut in 1999.
 Pranks (also known as The Dorm That Dripped Blood and Death Dorm) — Released with 10 seconds cut in 1992.
 Prisoner of the Cannibal God (original title: La montagna del dio cannibale, also known as Mountain of the Cannibal God and Slave of the Cannibal God) — Originally passed with cuts for cinema. Released with 2 minutes 6 seconds of animal cruelty cuts in 2001, and re-released with 2 minutes of similar cuts in 2018.
 Revenge of the Bogey Man (original title: Boogeyman II) — Released in re-edited form with additional footage in 2003.
 The Slayer — Released with 14 seconds cut in 1992. Re-released uncut in 2001.
 Terror Eyes (also known as Night School) — Originally passed with cuts for cinema. Released with 1 minute 16 seconds cut in 1987.
 The Toolbox Murders — Originally passed with cuts for cinema. Released with 1 minute 46 seconds cut in 2000. Re-released uncut in 2017. 
 Unhinged — Originally passed uncut for cinema. Released uncut in 2004.
 Visiting Hours — Originally passed with cuts for cinema. Released with approximately 1 minute cut in 1986. Passed uncut in 2017.
 The Witch Who Came From the Sea — Released uncut in 2006.
 Women Behind Bars (original title: Des diamants pour l'enfer) — Passed uncut in 2017.
 Zombie Creeping Flesh (also known as Hell of the Living Dead, Night of the Zombies and Virus) — Originally passed uncut for cinema in an edited version. Full version released uncut in 2002.

Section 3: Video Nasties 
A supplementary list was issued along with the official list which featured a list of so-called "Section 3 Video Nasties". Titles on the Section 3 list could not be prosecuted for obscenity but were liable to seizure and confiscation under a "less obscene" charge. Tapes seized under Section 3 could be destroyed after distributors or merchants forfeited them.

 Abducted (a.k.a. Schoolgirls in Chains) – No UK re-release.
 The Aftermath (a.k.a. Zombie Aftermath) – No UK re-release.
 The Black Room – Originally passed uncut for cinema. No UK re-release.
 Blood Lust (a.k.a. Mosquito the Rapist) – Passed with heavy cuts for cinema. No UK re-release.
 Blood Song – Re-released as Dream Slayer.
 Blue Eyes of the Broken Doll – No UK re-release.
 Brutes and Savages – No UK re-release.
 Cannibal (a.k.a. Ultimo Mondo Cannibale and Last Cannibal World) – Originally passed with heavy cuts for cinema. Released with 2m 46s of cuts in 2003.
 Cannibal World (a.k.a. Mondo Cannibale and The Cannibals) – No UK re-release.
 The Chant of Jimmie Blacksmith – Passed uncut for cinema in 1978. Released without cuts in 1987.
 The Child – Passed uncut for cinema. Released uncut in 2006.
 Christmas Evil (a.k.a. You Better Watch Out) – Released uncut in 2012 with a 15 rating. 
 Communion (a.k.a. Alice Sweet Alice) – Passed uncut for cinema. Passed with 8s of cuts in 1998. Released uncut in 2014.
 Dawn of the Dead – Originally passed with heavy cuts for cinema. Passed with cuts for video in 1989 and 1997. Released uncut in 2003.
 Dawn of the Mummy – Passed with 27s of cuts for cinema. Passed with 1m 43s of cuts for video in 1987. Released uncut in 2003.
 Dead Kids (a.k.a. Strange Behavior) – Passed with 27s of cuts in 1993 and 2008.
 Death Weekend (a.k.a. The House by the Lake) – Passed with cuts for cinema. No UK re-release.
 Deep Red (a.k.a. Profondo Rosso) – Passed with 11s of cuts in 1993. The extended version was passed uncut in 2010.
 Demented – Released with 1m 19s of cuts in 1987.
 The Demons (a.k.a. Les Démons) – A composite version was passed uncut in 2008 and the original version was passed uncut in 2017.
 Don't Answer the Phone – Passed with cuts for cinema. An edited version was released without further cuts in 2005.
 Eaten Alive! – Passed with heavy cuts for cinema. Passed with heavy cuts for animal cruelty in 1987 and 1992.
 Enter the Devil (a.k.a. Disciples Of Death) – No UK re-release.
 The Erotic Rites of Frankenstein – Released uncut in the U.K. on 22nd Jan, 2018, with an "18" certificate. 
 The Evil – No UK re-release.
 The Executioner (a.k.a. Massacre Mafia Style) – No UK re-release.
 Final Exam – Released uncut in 1986.
 Foxy Brown – Passed in edited form for cinema. Passed with 2m 48s of cuts in 1987. Released with previous cuts waived in 1998.
 Friday the 13th – The R-rated version was released without cuts in 1987. The full unrated version (previously released for cinema) was released uncut in 2003.
 Friday the 13th Part 2 – The R-rated version was passed uncut in 1987. Downgraded to an uncut 15 certificate in 2008.
 GBH (a.k.a. Grievous Bodily Harm) – No UK re-release.
 Graduation Day – Passed uncut in 1986. Downgraded to an uncut 15 certificate in 2003.
 Happy Birthday to Me – Passed uncut for cinema. Also passed uncut for video in 1986. Downgraded to an uncut 15 certificate in 2004.
 The Headless Eyes – No UK re-release.
 Hell Prison (a.k.a. Escape from Hell) – No UK re-release.
 The Hills Have Eyes – Passed with cuts for cinema. Passed with 2s of cuts for video in 1987. Released uncut in 2003.
 Home Sweet Home – Released uncut in 2004.
 Honeymoon Horror – No UK re-release.
 Inseminoid – Passed uncut for cinema. Also passed uncut for video in 1987. Downgraded to a 15 certificate in 2005.
 Invasion of the Blood Farmers – No UK re-release.
 The Killing Hour (a.k.a. The Clairvoyant) – Passed with 1m 19s of cuts in 1986.
 The Last Horror Film (a.k.a. Fanatic) – Passed with cuts for cinema. An edited version was released in 2003.
 The Last Hunter – Passed uncut for cinema. Passed with 8s of cuts in 1988. Released uncut in 2002.
 The Love Butcher – No UK re-release.
 Mad Foxes – No UK re-release.
 Mark of the Devil – Passed with heavy cuts for cinema. Passed with cuts in 1998 and 2003. Released uncut in 2013.
 Martin – Passed uncut for cinema. Also passed uncut for video in 1994.
 Massacre Mansion (a.k.a. Mansion of the Doomed) – Passed uncut for cinema. Also passed uncut for video in 1992. Downgraded to an uncut 15 certificate in 2000.
 Mausoleum – Released uncut in 1987.
 Midnight – Passed uncut for cinema. An edited version was released in 1993. Full version passed uncut in 2011. 
 Naked Fist (a.k.a. Firecracker) – Passed with 3m 53s of cuts for cinema. No UK re-release.
 The Nesting – Passed uncut in 1986.
 The New Adventures of Snow White (a.k.a. Grimm Fairy Tales for Adults) – No UK re-release.
 Nightbeast – Passed uncut in 1996.
 Night of the Living Dead – Passed with cuts for cinema. Released uncut in 1987. Downgraded to a 15 certificate in 2007.
 Nightmare City (a.k.a. City of the Walking Dead) – Passed with 3m 5s of cuts in 1986. Released uncut in 2003.
 Oasis of the Zombies – Passed uncut in 2004 with a 15 certificate.
 Parasite – Passed uncut for cinema. Also passed uncut for video in 1993.
 Phantasm – Passed uncut for cinema. Also passed uncut for video in 1989. Downgraded to a 15 certificate in 2005.
 Pigs (a.k.a. Daddy's Deadly Darling) – Released by 88 Films in 2016. Unknown if cut.
 Prey – Passed with 11s of cuts for cinema and video. A print shortened for dialogue was passed uncut in 2004.
 Prom Night – Passed uncut for cinema. Also passed uncut for video in 1987.
 Rabid – Passed uncut for cinema. Also passed uncut for video in 1992.
 Rosemary's Killer (a.k.a. The Prowler) – Passed with cuts for cinema. Released uncut in 2007.
 Savage Terror (a.k.a. Primitives) – No UK re-release.
 Scanners – Passed uncut for cinema. Also passed uncut for video in 1987.
 Scream for Vengeance! – No UK re-release.
 Shogun Assassin – Passed with cuts for cinema. Released uncut in 1999.
 Street Killers (a.k.a. Beast with a Gun) – No UK re-release.
 Suicide Cult (a.k.a. The Astrologer) – No UK re-release.
 Superstition (a.k.a. The Witch) – Passed uncut for cinema. Also passed uncut for video in 1986.
 Suspiria – Passed with cuts for cinema. Released uncut in 1998.
 Terror – Passed with cuts for cinema. Released uncut in 1997.
 The Texas Chain Saw Massacre — Refused a cinema certificate in 1975. Passed uncut in 1999.
 The Thing – Passed uncut for cinema. Also passed uncut for video in 1987.
 Tomb of the Living Dead (a.k.a. Mad Doctor of Blood Island) – Passed with cuts for cinema. Released with 42s of animal cruelty cuts in 2003.
 The Toy Box – No UK re-release.
 Werewolf Woman – Passed with cuts for cinema. No UK re-release.
 Wrong Way – No UK re-release.
 Xtro – Passed uncut for cinema. Also passed uncut for video in 1987. Downgraded to an uncut 15 certificate in 2007.
 Zombie Holocaust – Passed uncut in 2000.
 Zombie Lake – Passed uncut in 2004.

Films banned by the BBFC but not classed as video nasties 
 Maniac — Banned for cinema in 1981 and again for video in 1998. Released with 58 seconds of cuts in 2002. Released uncut in 2022.
 Mother's Day — Banned for cinema in 1980. Released uncut in 2015.
 The New York Ripper — Banned for cinema in 1982 and re-exported to original distributor in Italy. Released with 29 seconds of cuts in 2002.
 Silent Night, Deadly Night – Denied a BBFC certificate. Released uncut with an 18 certificate in 2008.
 Straw Dogs — Originally passed uncut for cinema. Withdrawn around the video nasty period but not actually included on the list. It was given an uncut theatrical re-release in 1995 but two subsequent attempts to pass the film for video in 1999 resulted in BBFC rejections. It was finally released uncut in 2002.

Other films seized by the police but not classed as video nasties

Other films 
 A Clockwork Orange – Sometimes mistakenly believed to have been banned by the BBFC, it was actually Stanley Kubrick himself who withdrew the film from exhibition in the UK in 1973 on police advice after receiving death threats toward himself and his family, as well as disliking reports found in the British Press that the film was responsible for copycat violence. Quoting Kubrick: "To try and fasten any responsibility on art as the cause of life seems to me to put the case the wrong way around. Art consists of reshaping life but it does not create life, nor cause life. Furthermore, to attribute powerful suggestive qualities to a film is at odds with the scientifically accepted view that, even after deep hypnosis, in a posthypnotic state, people cannot be made to do things which are at odds with their natures". After Kubrick's death, the film was re-released uncut at cinemas in the UK in 2000, and thereafter on both VHS and DVD.
 Child's Play 3 – The film became notorious in the United Kingdom when it was suggested it might have inspired the real-life murder of British child James Bulger (a suggestion rejected by officers investigating the case) and the murder of Suzanne Capper.
 The Exorcist – Although never officially cut or banned in the UK, several attempts to release the film on video were thwarted by BBFC censor James Ferman, who cited both the age of the possessed girl (as she was under 12, the film might have had significant appeal to underaged viewers) and reports of incidents of hysteria involving young women (leading to concerns that the film might cause severe emotional problems for those who believed in demonic possession) as obstacles to a home release. Following a successful theatrical re-release in 1998 and Ferman's retirement as censor in January 1999, the film was submitted for home video release for the first time in February 1999, and was passed uncut with an "18" certificate. The film had previously been released on video in 1981, uncertificated, by Warner Home Video. 
 Last House on Dead End Street – Also known as The Fun House, this film may have been the intended target when the BBFC added The Funhouse to the list. Passed uncut with an "18" certificate in 2006.
 Scum – The original TV film was made by the BBC, but they later decided not to broadcast it owing to the violence and suicides in the film. It was quickly remade by most of the original production team and released in cinemas, and was released on VHS at the height of the Video Nasties controversy, quickly becoming associated with them in the media.
 Mikey – The film was withdrawn from release in the United Kingdom following the James Bulger murder in Liverpool in 1993. The decision was made by the BBFC which refused to issue it with a UK release certificate in 1996. It remains prohibited in the UK.

Republic of Ireland
The moral concern extended to the Republic of Ireland. In 1986, the Dáil Select Committee on Criminal Lawlessness and Vandalism issued a report "Controls on video nasties" recommending that the powers of the film censor's office be extended to videos. This was implemented by the Video Recordings Act in 1989.

See also 

 Film censorship in the United Kingdom
 List of Hong Kong Category III films
 Extreme cinema
 Vulgar auteurism

References

Sources 
 
 
 
 
 Ban the Sadist Videos Pt 1 (documentary)
 Ban the Sadist Videos Pt 2 (documentary)
 Video Nasties: Moral Panic, Censorship & Videotape (documentary)
 Video Nasties: Draconian Days (documentary)

Further reading

External links 
 Overview of all video nasties
 History of video nasties
 
 UK Pre Certification video database with additional information

Midnight movie
Film censorship in the United Kingdom
Obscenity controversies in film
Entertainment scandals
Controversies in the United Kingdom
Nasty
Film controversies
1980s in the United Kingdom
1980s in film
1980s neologisms